Stéphane Tchichelle was a politician from Congo Republic who served as First Vice President of Republic of the Congo and Minister of Foreign Affarirs.

Personal life 
He was born on 12 January 1915 in Kouilou Region and educated at Loango Mission School, Republic of the Congo and became Station Master in Pointe-Noire railway station in 1936. He served as Minister of Foreign Affairs from 1960 to 1963 and Vice President of the Republic of the Congo from 1961 to 1963.

References 

1915 births
Vice presidents of the Republic of the Congo